Mike Heidorn, born 1967 in Belleville, Illinois, is the former drummer and founding member of alternative country bands Uncle Tupelo and Son Volt. Heidorn also played with the Uncle Tupelo precursors the Primitives (or ) and the one-off band Coffee Creek with Jay Farrar and Jeff Tweedy of Uncle Tupelo and Brian Henneman of The Bottle Rockets.

Heidorn got married and left Uncle Tupelo after the recording of their third album, March 16–20, 1992. After the breakup of Uncle Tupelo, Heidorn was reactivated by Farrar and joined the first version of Son Volt, but was not involved in the reformation of the band in 2005 and is no longer active as a professional musician.

References

1967 births
Living people
American rock drummers
People from Belleville, Illinois
Musicians from Illinois
Son Volt members
Uncle Tupelo members
20th-century American drummers
American male drummers
20th-century American male musicians